Thomas Edward Nissalke (July 7, 1932 – August 22, 2019) was an American professional basketball coach in the National Basketball Association and American Basketball Association.  He coached several teams in both leagues, and had an overall coaching record of 371–508.

Coaching career

After a season with the Dallas Chaparrals (where he won ABA coach of the Year), Nissalke moved to the NBA with the Sonics for one season. He returned to the team, now in San Antonio, in 1973, bringing with him "a patterned, deliberate offense to San Antonio". During his tenure, the "Iceman" George Gervin had arrived from the Virginia Squires and was the center of the team. Though Nissalke's club was successful, he was fired in the beginning of the 1974–75 ABA season. Nissalke, who is a graduate of Florida State University, first got his start in coaching on the high school-prep level at the Wayland Academy in Beaver Dam, Wisconsin. He later worked his way onto the college ranks at the University of Wisconsin and Tulane.

High School Coaching Career
Nissalke started his coaching career at Wayland Academy as the varsity boys basketball coach when he was hired by Ray Patterson (basketball), his former coach.  Nissalke coached there from 1957 until 1962 when he went on to the college ranks, thus advancing his career.  He finished with an overall record of 49–41 at Wayland.

1957–58  Overall record 6–12  Conference record 5–9

1958–59  Overall record 13–5

1959–60  Overall record 9–9

1960–61  Overall record 12–5  Conference record 12–2 (conference champions)

1961–62  Overall record 9–10

Early pro coaching career

Nissalke then went to Utah with the ABA's Stars, but the club folded, surprisingly, at mid-season in the ABA's last hurrah in 1975–76. According to Remember the ABA, he has the final game ball in his closet.

Later pro coaching career
Nissalke succeeded Johnny Egan as Houston Rockets head coach on April 20, 1976. He received another Coach of the Year in the NBA in 76–77). He later served in a similar capacity with the Utah Jazz and Cleveland Cavaliers before retiring in 1985.

Nissalke holds the rare distinction of being named "Coach of the Year" in both the NBA and the ABA. He was also the commissioner of the short-lived National Basketball League in Canada in 1993–94. He had a combined coaching record of 371–508 (248–391 in NBA and 123–117 in ABA), with an 11–20 playoff record.	He went 105–91 with the Chaparrals/Spurs, 13–32 with the Sonics, 18–26 with the Utah Stars, 124–122 with the Rockets, 60–124 with the Jazz, and 51–113 with the Cavaliers. He made it out of the first round of the playoffs just once, in 1977.

Other Professional
Nissalke's entrepreneurial activities included developing and owning several health clubs throughout Texas in addition to co-owning a successful bar and restaurant, Green Street in Salt Lake City, Utah for over twenty years.

After his coaching career, Nissalke took on revamping the YMCA of Utah and served as Chairman of the Board and later interim CEO.  The YMCA had its most successful fundraising campaigns during his tenure.

Olympic Coaching
Nissalke was the coach of Puerto Rico at the 1976 Summer Olympics in Montreal, finishing in 9th place with a 2–5 record. Nissalke's squad came close to upsetting the United States, losing by a 94–93 score.

Head coaching record

|-
|align="left"|Dallas*
|align="left"|1971–72
| 84 || 42 || 42 ||  ||align="center"|3rd in Western || 4 || 0 || 4 || 
|align="center"|Lost in Div. Semifinals
|-
|align="left"|Seattle
|align="left"|
| 45 || 13 || 32 ||  ||align="center"|(fired)|| – || – || – || 
|align="center"|–
|-
|align="left"|San Antonio*
|align="left"|1973–74
| 84 || 45 || 39 ||  ||align="center"|3rd in Western || 7 || 3 || 4 || 
|align="center"|Lost in Div. Semifinals
|-
|align="left"|San Antonio*
|align="left"|1974–75
| 28 || 18 || 10 ||  ||align="center"|(resigned)|| – || – || – || 
|align="center"|–
|-
|align="left"|Utah*
|align="left"|1974–75
| 28 || 14 || 14 ||  ||align="center"|4th in Western|| 6 || 2 || 4 || 
|align="center"|Lost in Div. Semifinals
|-
|align="left"|Utah*
|align="left"|1975–76
| 16 || 4 || 12 ||  ||align="center"|(folded)|| – || – || – || 
|align="center"|–
|-
|align="left"|Houston
|align="left"|
| 82 || 49 || 33 ||  ||align="center"|1st in Central|| 12 || 6 || 6 || 
|align="center"|Lost in Conf. Finals
|-
|align="left"|Houston
|align="left"|
| 82 || 28 || 54 ||  ||align="center"|6th in Central|| – || – || – || 
|align="center"|Missed Playoffs
|-
|align="left"|Houston
|align="left"|
| 82 || 47 || 35 ||  ||align="center"|2nd in Central || 2 || 0 || 2 || 
|align="center"|Lost in First Round
|-
|align="left"|Utah
|align="left"|
| 82 || 24 || 58 ||  ||align="center"|5th in Midwest || – || – || – || 
|align="center"|Missed Playoffs
|-
|align="left"|Utah
|align="left"|
| 82 || 28 || 54 ||  ||align="center"|5th in Midwest || – || – || – || 
|align="center"|Missed Playoffs
|-
|align="left"|Utah
|align="left"|
| 20 || 8 || 12 ||  ||align="center"|(fired)|| – || – || – || 
|align="center"|–
|-
|align="left"|Cleveland
|align="left"|
| 82 || 23 || 59 ||  ||align="center"|5th in Central|| – || – || – || 
|align="center"|Missed Playoffs
|-
|align="left"|Cleveland
|align="left"|
| 82 || 28 || 54 ||  ||align="center"|4th in Central|| – || – || – || 
|align="center"|Missed Playoffs
|- class="sortbottom"
|align="left"|Career
| || 879 || 371 || 508 ||  || || 31 || 11 || 20 ||  ||

Family life and personal

In January 2006, his wife of 46 years, Nancy, who also was a native of Madison, Wisconsin, died, succumbing to cancer. Together they had two children and two granddaughters.

On August 22, 2019, Nissalke died at his home in Salt Lake City, Utah.

References

External links
 BasketballReference.com: Tom Nissalke

1932 births
2019 deaths
American expatriate basketball people in Canada
American men's basketball coaches
American men's basketball players
Basketball coaches from Wisconsin
Basketball players from Wisconsin
BSN coaches
Charlotte Hornets assistant coaches
Cleveland Cavaliers head coaches
Continental Basketball Association coaches
Dallas Chaparrals head coaches
Denver Nuggets assistant coaches
Florida State Seminoles men's basketball players
High school basketball coaches in the United States
Houston Rockets head coaches
National Basketball Association broadcasters
San Antonio Spurs head coaches
Seattle SuperSonics head coaches
Sportspeople from Madison, Wisconsin
Tulane Green Wave men's basketball coaches
Utah Jazz head coaches
Utah Stars coaches
Wisconsin Badgers men's basketball coaches